Ukraine's 122nd electoral district is a Verkhovna Rada constituency in Lviv Oblast, Western Ukraine. Established in its current form in 2012, it includes Yavoriv Raion and Zhovkva Raion. The district is home to 178,460 registered voters, and has 205 polling stations. Its member of parliament has been Pavlo Bakunets of the Self Reliance party since 2019.

Members of Parliament

Elections

2019

2014

2012

See also
Electoral districts of Ukraine
Foreign electoral district of Ukraine

References

Electoral districts of Ukraine
Constituencies established in 2012